Upper Middleburgh Cemetery is a historic cemetery located at Middleburgh in Schoharie County, New York. It was incorporated in 1865 and contains an estimated 4,000 interments. The most notable structure is the Foster mausoleum, designed by architect Henry Bacon (1866–1924) in the early 1900s and includes a sculpture by Evelyn Beatrice Longman (1874–1954). There is also a Neo-Gothic Revival chapel (ca. 1925), maintenance and storage building (ca. 1880), and Timothy Murphy memorial, dedicated in 1910 and including a bronze bas-relief sculpture by Evelyn Beatrice Longman.

It was listed on the National Register of Historic Places in 2001.

References

Cemeteries on the National Register of Historic Places in New York (state)
1865 establishments in New York (state)
Cemeteries in Schoharie County, New York
National Register of Historic Places in Schoharie County, New York